Nathan Micklos (born August 5, 1983 in Palatine, Illinois) is an American former soccer forward who played professionally in the USL First and USL Second Division.

Youth
Micklos played club soccer with the Chicago Sockers from age thirteen until eighteen.  During his time with the team, they won five State Cup Championships, two Region II Championships and finished second at USYSA National Championships.  They also won the U-17 Dallas Cup.

In 2002, Micklos graduated from William Fremd High School.  He attended the University of Rochester, playing on the men's soccer team from 2002 to 2005.  During his four seasons, he set school records for career goals (57), career points (140) and goals in a season (20).  Micklos was University Athletic Association's Player of the Year as a junior and senior and the 2005 ESPN The Magazine College Division Academic All-American of the Year.  He was an NSCAA Division III Second Team All-American as a junior and Third Team All-American as a senior.  He was also named a First Team Scholar All-American by the National Soccer Coaches Association of America.  He graduated in December 2005 with a dual bachelor's degrees in political science and history with a minor in philosophy.

Club
During the 2005 college off season, Micklos played for the Indiana Invaders of the USL Premier Development League.  In 2006, he began his professional career with the Virginia Beach Mariners after being selected third overall in the USL First Division Draft.  In 2007, Micklos moved down to the Cincinnati Kings of the USL Second Division. He retired at the end of the season.

References

1983 births
Living people
American soccer players
Indiana Invaders players
Virginia Beach Mariners players
USL League Two players
USL First Division players
USL Second Division players
Cincinnati Kings players
Chicago Sockers players
Association football forwards
Soccer players from Illinois
People from Palatine, Illinois
Sportspeople from Cook County, Illinois
University of Rochester alumni
College men's soccer players in the United States